Arben Ristani (born 29 March 1969, in Tirana) is the former head of the Central Election Commission and currently a member of Democratic Party of Albania.

Ristani was first nominated by the Republican Party of Albania, while as head of KQZ he was promoted by Democratic Party of Albania. Ristani speaks English and French.

Professional Experience
Ristani worked on following places:
 1992–1994 District Court Judge in Tirana
 1993–1995 External Examiner, Faculty of Law Tirana
 1994–1997 Lawyer
 1997–1998 inspector in the Ministry of Justice
 1998–2002 Lawyer
 2002–2003 Legal Adviser of the President
 2003–2006 lawyer, vice president at the court, Tirana
 2006–2008 Member of the Central Election Commission
 2008–2009 Director of the ASM, Tirana
 2009–2012 Chairman of the Central Election Commission
 2012–2013 Deputy Minister of Interior

References

Living people
Electoral commissioners of Albania
1969 births
People from Tirana
20th-century Albanian judges
21st-century Albanian lawyers
University of Tirana alumni